Sławomir Szary (born July 31, 1979 in Wodzisław Śląski) is a Polish footballer who currently plays for Pniówek Pawłowice Śląskie.

Career

Club
He was released from Piast Gliwice on 28 June 2011.

In July 2011, joined Olimpia Elbląg on a one-year contract.

References

External links
 

1979 births
Living people
People from Kietrz
Polish footballers
Ekstraklasa players
Odra Wodzisław Śląski players
Piast Gliwice players
Olimpia Elbląg players
Sportspeople from Opole Voivodeship
Association football defenders